Charles Stewart (March 26, 1917 – October 3, 1991) was a Canadian politician who served as a member of the Legislative Assembly of Alberta from 1975 to 1982, sitting with the governing Progressive Conservative caucus.

Political career
Stewart ran for a seat to the Alberta Legislature in the 1975 Alberta general election. He won the electoral district of Wainwright defeating two other candidates by a comfortable majority to pick up the seat for the governing Progressive Conservative party.

He ran for a second term in office in the 1979 Alberta general election. Despite the opposition making gains Stewart slightly improved on his total popular vote. This resulted in him keeping seat by a comfortable majority. He retired from provincial politics at dissolution of the assembly in 1982.

References

External links
Legislative Assembly of Alberta Members Listing

Progressive Conservative Association of Alberta MLAs
1917 births
1991 deaths
Place of birth missing
Place of death missing